Absinthe is a distilled alcoholic beverage.

Absinthe may also refer to:

Music 
Absinthe (Marc Almond album) (1993), by Marc Almond
Absinthe (Naked City album) (1993), by Naked City
Absinthe: La Folie Verte (2001), by Blood Axis and Les Joyaux De La Princesse
Absinthe, a 2018 song by I Dont Know How But They Found Me from their EP 1981 Extended Play

Other uses
L'Absinthe, a 1876 painting by Edgar Degas
Absinthe (film), a 1914 American silent film directed by Herbert Brenon
Absinthe (show), an American circus performance which premiered 2006
Absinthe (software), a tool to untethered jailbreak the iPhone 4S and iPad 2

See also
AbsInt
Absinthiana
Absynthe (disambiguation)